Oleksa Kharlampiyovych Novakivskyi (Ukrainian: Оле́кса Харла́мпійович Новакі́вський; 14 March 1872, Obodyvka, Trostianets Raion, Vinnytsia Oblast — 29 August 1935, Lviv) was a Ukrainian painter and art teacher; known largely as an Impressionist.

Biography 
He was born to a forester who worked at the estate of an aristocratic Polish family. A local nobleman took note of his talent and provided the means for him to pursue an artistic education. From 1888 to 1892, he studied in Odessa with the watercolorist and decorative painter, Filip Klimenko (1862-c.1917). Further support enabled him to transfer to the Kraków Academy of Fine Arts, where he worked with Jan Matejko (until his death) then Leon Wyczółkowski, among others. He graduated in 1900. 

For about ten years, he lived in the village of Mogila, now on the Polish-Ukrainian border. He shared a house with an elderly widow whose daughter he later married. His first exhibit was with the Society for the Development of Russian Art, in 1901, but he achieved little attention until his personal exhibition in Kraków in 1911. 

He moved to Lviv in 1913, with the patronage of the Metropolitan Archbishop, Andrey Sheptytsky. Shortly after, he started his own art school. Most of the noted painters of early twentieth-century Galicia studied there, at least briefly.

His most successful exhibition came in 1921.

He is buried in Lychakiv Cemetery.

References

External links 

 "The Search for New Roads" @ Izbornyk
 Oleksa Novakivskyi, a monograph by Volodymyr Zalozetskyi. Full text online @ the Vernadsky National Library of Ukraine
 Ukrainian Artists: Novakivskyi, Full text online @ the Vernadsky National Library of Ukraine
 Biography and paintings @ UA (blog)

1872 births
1935 deaths
Ukrainian painters
Ukrainian male painters
People from Vinnytsia Oblast